= Judacot =

Catalan Jew (fl. 9th century)

Judacot (also Judah) (fl. 876/877 CE) was a Catalan Jew known for acting as a messenger between the emperor Charles the Bald to the Bishop of Barcelona, Frodoinus. He is primarily known from a letter written by the emperor in 876.

As seen in the letter Charles the Bald wrote to the bishop, Judacot was evidently a highly-trusted individual whose opinion the emperor valued. Charles referred to him as both Judacot and Judah, and described him as fidelis ('our faithful'). Judacot had given the emperor a glowing report of the bishop's loyalty, and, as a reward for this loyalty, the emperor was sending Judacot to the bishop with 10 pounds of silver to fund church repairs.

Judacot is one of the earliest Catalan Jews who appears by name in written records.

== Bibliography ==
- Elnecavé, Nissim: Los hijos de Ibero-Franconia, La Luz, Buenos Aires, 1982, page 34.
- enciclopedia.cat
